Adam Burton (born 17 March 1972 in Melbourne, Victoria) is an Australian baseball player. He represented Australia at the 2000 Summer Olympics. Burton also played for the Melbourne Reds in the 1997-98 season.

References

External links
 
 
 

1972 births
Olympic baseball players of Australia
Australian baseball players
Baseball players at the 2000 Summer Olympics
Living people
Sportspeople from Melbourne
Melbourne Reds players